The Hearth is a live album featuring a performance by Cecil Taylor with Tristan Honsinger and Evan Parker recorded in Berlin on June 30, 1988, as part of month-long series of concerts by Taylor and released on the FMP label.

Critical reception

The AllMusic review by Thom Jurek states "This is a devastatingly fine gig, and one of the best Taylor played the entire month he was in Berlin". The authors of The Penguin Guide to Jazz Recordings say that the album is one of those they would highlight from the series as “particularly brilliant examples of Taylor’s adaptive capabilities and his partners’ own contributions”. Critic Gary Giddins called the album "a romantic effusion, occasionally discursive and consistently beguiling."

Track listing
All compositions by Cecil Taylor, Tristan Honsinger and Evan Parker.
 "The Hearth" - 61:31 
Recorded in Berlin on June 30, 1988

Personnel
Cecil Taylor: piano, voice
Tristan Honsinger: cello
Evan Parker: tenor saxophone

References

1989 live albums
Cecil Taylor live albums
FMP Records live albums